Poecilotheria miranda, also known as the Bengal ornamental is a species of tarantula. The species is endemic to India.

Distribution
Endemic to India, this tiger spider is the least observed from all. They are known only from Chhota Nagpur region.

Identification
Both first and fourth leg pairs are identically marked, where femur is black with a thin distal white band. Patella is whitish cream. Tibia whitish proximally, with a black band distally.

References

Spiders of the Indian subcontinent
miranda
Spiders described in 1900